The coat of arms of the state of New Jersey includes:
A shield with three plows, representative of New Jersey's agricultural tradition.
A forward-facing helmet.
A horse's head as the crest of the helmet.
The female figures Liberty and Ceres, representative of the state's motto (see next item).  Liberty is holding a staff supporting a stylized Phrygian cap; Ceres is holding an overflowing cornucopia.
The streamer at the foot of the emblem contains the State Motto of New Jersey, "Liberty and Prosperity", and the year of statehood, 1776.

It was originally designed by Pierre Eugene du Simitiere in 1777 and was modified slightly in 1928.

The seal is the central motif in the flag of New Jersey and the great seal of the state of New Jersey.

The coat of arms contains a horse's head; beneath that is a helmet, showing that New Jersey governs itself, and it has three plows on a shield to highlight the state's agriculture tradition, which shows why the state has the nickname "Garden State". The two Goddesses represent the state motto, "Liberty and Prosperity". Liberty is on the left. She is holding a staff with a liberty cap on it, and the word liberty underneath her. The goddess on the right is Ceres, goddess of agriculture. She is holding a cornucopia with prosperity written below her.

According to the minutes of the New Jersey General Assembly for May 11, 1896, the date on which the Assembly officially approved the flag as the state emblem, the buff color is due indirectly to George Washington, who had ordered on September 14, 1779, that the uniform coats of the New Jersey Continental Line be dark (Jersey) blue, with buff facings. Buff-colored facings had until then been reserved only for his own uniform and those of other Continental generals and their aides. Then, on February 14, 1780, the Continental War Officers in Philadelphia directed that the uniform coat facings of all regiments were to be the same as the background color of the regiments' state flag.

The seal is described in New Jersey statute Title 52, §2-1:

In 2015 a circular letter issued by the State of New Jersey Department of the Treasury addressed the issue of unapproved and incorrect versions of "The Great Seal of the State of New Jersey". Many incorrectly show the underskirt in blue and not argent.

NJ Advance Media and NJ.com ran a contest in 2016 to create a new flag for New Jersey.  A winning design by Andrew Maris of Fair Haven was chosen, but no legislative action has been taken to authorize a new flag.

Flag

The flag of the state of New Jersey includes the coat of arms of the state on a buff-colored background. In a 1965 law, the specific color shades of Jersey blue and buff were defined by the state. Using the Cable color system developed by the Color Association of the United States, Jersey Blue was defined as Cable No. 70087; Buff was defined as Cable No. 65015. The Office of the Secretary of State of New Jersey gives the blue and buff color hexadecimal equivalents as #2484C6 and #E1B584, respectively.

Government seals of New Jersey

See also

 List of New Jersey state symbols
 Broad Seal War

References

External links
The Great Seal of the State of New Jersey
Minutes of the New Jersey General Assembly for March 11, 1896

New Jersey
Symbols of New Jersey
New Jersey
New Jersey
New Jersey
New Jersey
New Jersey
New Jersey
Ceres (mythology)
Roman goddesses in art